Ann-Kio Briggs, alternatively spelled Annkio Briggs, (born 29 July 1952 in England) is an English-born Nigerian environmentalist and human rights activist. She is the founder and director of the non-governmental organization Agape Birthrights. As of 2011, she was spokesperson of the Ijaw Republican Assembly (IRA) as well as the United Niger Delta Energy Development Security Strategy (UNDEDSS).

Early life and education
Briggs was born on 29 July 1952 in England. She was born to a British mother and an Ijaw marine engineer. During her early years, she was taken to live with her paternal grandmother who raised her alongside her father in Abonnema, Rivers State. From (1967 to 1970), her academic studies were impeded by the civil war, and after it ended, Briggs moved with her family to England where she studied Marketing. Briggs married during her stay in England. She and her husband had four children together and divorced in 1998. Briggs is fluent in Igbo, as well as her native language, Kalabari. She also speaks Pidgin English.

Career 
In 1998, after  several years in Europe, she returned to the Niger Delta and established Agape Birthrights, a non-governmental and a non-profit organization, having its headquarters in D-line Rivers State. Briggs, through her organization she has helped some developing areas to documents cleaning of oil spillage and fighting against injustices and marginalisation. She also collaborates internationally with other organizations home and abroad.

See also
List of people from Rivers State

References

External links
Agape Birthrights website

1952 births
Living people
Activists from Rivers State
Nigerian environmentalists
Nigerian women environmentalists
Nigerian people of English descent
English people of Nigerian descent
Nigerian human rights activists
Ijaw people
Holy Rosary College alumni
Nigerian Christians